Colin Fleming and Ross Hutchins were the defending champions, but could not compete together this year due to Hutchins being out with ongoing illness.
Fleming competed alongside fellow Brit Jonathan Marray but lost in the final against top seeds Alexander Peya and Bruno Soares, 6–3, 3–6, [8–10].

Seeds

Draw

Draw

References
Main draw

Aegon Internationalandnbsp;- Doubles
2013 Men's Doubles